Alexandria Community School Corporation is a school district headquartered in Alexandria, Indiana.

Schools
 Alexandria-Monroe Jr./Sr. High School
 Alexandria-Monroe Academy
 Alexandria-Monroe Elementary School

References

External links
 Alexandria Community School Corporation

School districts in Indiana
Education in Madison County, Indiana